Galina Viktorovna Danilchenko (born 5 July 1964) is a Russian and Ukrainian accountant and politician who was installed by Russia as the acting mayor of Melitopol during the 2022 Russian invasion of Ukraine, following the kidnapping of Ivan Fedorov by the Russian military. She was a former member of the Melitopol City Council, elected in 2015, and became its secretary soon thereafter.

Biography 
Danilchenko was born 5 July 1964 in Orlovo, a village in the Melitopol district. She studied at the  She graduated from the Russian State Agrarian University – Moscow Timiryazev Agricultural Academy. She worked in a kindergarten for a few weeks and worked in a laboratory at a hydraulic tractor plant.

After completing a specialization in economics and auditing, she worked as an accountant at a motor plant. In 2000, she began working as an accountant for Melitopol Plain Bearing Plant until 2015. She is now the director of the factory. The company is owned by Yevhen Balytskyi.

Balitsky suggested that Danilchenko enter politics. Until 2015, she was a member of the Party of Regions. In 2015, she was elected to the Melitopol City Council as a member of the Opposition Bloc and was appointed its secretary by Balytskyi soon thereafter. In 2021, Danylchenko was nominated to the position of director of the Zaporizhzhia Regional Contact Centre.

2022 Russian invasion of Ukraine 

Danilchenko, former member of the City Council, was installed by the Russian occupation forces as acting mayor on 12 March 2022, the day after mayor Ivan Fedorov's abduction by the Russian military. At the same time she announced that the City Council was being abolished and replaced by a "committee of people's deputies". She urged city residents to accept "the new reality in order to start living in a new way as soon as possible." Danylchenko thanked the head of Chechnya, Ramzan Kadyrov, for humanitarian aid.

On 13 March 2022 Iryna Venediktova, Prosecutor General of Ukraine, opened an investigation against Danilchenko for the crime of treason for attempting to set up an occupying government in Melitopol; the investigation was opened at the request of the Melitopol City Council. On the same day, Danylchenko announced that Russian TV channels would be broadcast in Melitopol, claiming that "a great deficit of trustworthy information being circulated" existed.

According to the Security Service of Ukraine (SBU) and BBC, Danylchenko does not wield power as mayor of Melitopol, and is instead a front for Yevgeny Balitsky, who she worked under prior to entering politics.

Personal life 
She voted for Viktor Yushchenko but was not satisfied by his presidency. In 2017, she called Petro Poroshenko the worst president, and stated that she regretted voting for him.

Notes

References 

1964 births
Living people
21st-century Ukrainian women politicians
Ukrainian city councillors
People from Zaporizhzhia Oblast
Opposition Bloc politicians
Ukrainian accountants
Ukrainian collaborators with Russia during the 2022 Russian invasion of Ukraine
Women accountants
Women mayors of places in Ukraine
Mayors of Melitopol
United Russia politicians